Sam Rani Zai is a tehsil located in Malakand District, Khyber Pakhtunkhwa, Pakistan.

District Malakand has 2 tehsils i.e. Swat Rani Zai and Sam Rani Zai. Each Tehsil comprises certain numbers of Union councils. There are 28 union councils in district Malakand.

See also 

Malakand District

References

External links
Khyber-Pakhtunkhwa Government website section on Lower Dir
United Nations
Hajjinfo.org Uploads
 PBS paiman.jsi.com

Malakand District
Tehsils of Malakand District
Populated places in Malakand District